George Kodinos or Codinus, also Pseudo-Kodinos, kouropalates in the Byzantine court, is the reputed 14th-century author of three extant works in late Byzantine literature.

Their attribution to him is merely a matter of convenience, two of them being anonymous in the manuscripts. Οf Kodinos himself nothing is known; it is supposed that he lived towards the end of the 14th century. The works referred to are the following:
Patria (Πάτρια Κωνσταντινουπόλεως), treating of the history, topography, and monuments of Constantinople. It is divided into five sections: (a) the foundation of the city; (b) its situation, limits and topography; (c) its statues, works of art, and other notable sights; (d) its buildings; (e) and the construction of the Hagia Sophia. It was written in the reign of Basil II (976-1025), revised and rearranged under Alexios I Komnenos (1081–1118), and perhaps copied by Codinus, whose name it bears in some (later) manuscripts. The chief sources are: the Patria of Hesychius Illustrius of Miletus, the anonymous Parastaseis syntomoi chronikai, and an anonymous account of St Sophia (ed. Theodor Preger in Scriptores originum Constantinopolitanarum, fasc. i, 1901, followed by the Patria of Codinus). Procopius, De Aedificiis and the poem of Paulus Silentiarius on the dedication of St. Sophia should be read in connexion with this subject.
De Officiis, a treatise, written in an unattractive style between 1347 and 1368, of the court and higher ecclesiastical dignities and of the ceremonies proper to different occasions, as they had evolved by the middle Palaiologan period. It should be compared with the earlier De Ceremoniis of Constantine Porphyrogenitus and other Taktika of the 9th and 10th centuries .
A chronological outline of events from the beginning of the world to the Fall of Constantinople to the Ottomans (called Agarenes in the manuscript title).

Complete editions are (by Immanuel Bekker) in the Bonn Corpus scriptorum Hist. Byz. (1839–1843, where, however, some sections of the Patria are omitted), and in JP Migne, Patrologia graeca civil.; see also Karl Krumbacher, Geschichte der byzantinischen Litteratur (1897).

References

 

Greek religious writers
14th-century Byzantine historians
Kouropalatai
14th-century Greek writers